Harish Kumar may refer to:

Harish Kumar (actor) (born 1975), Indian film actor
Harish Kumar (cricketer), Indian cricketer
Harish Kumar Gangawar (born 1930), Indian Member of Parliament
Harish Kumar (sepak takraw), Indian athlete
Queen Harish (1979 - 2 June 2019), Indian drag dancer